One Step Closer is the seventh release and fifth studio album of Colorado-based jam band, The String Cheese Incident. Released in June 2005, and containing thirteen original tracks with guest songwriting collaborations, the album was produced by Malcolm Burn at a studio in Boulder, Colorado. One Step Closer was a return to the more roots-based music of earlier String Cheese Incident fare, while still retaining some of the pop sensibility of previous studio albums. It was also the first album to feature new member Jason Hann.

Track listing

*Bonus Material - Bonus 30 Minute DVD Documentary - The Big Compromise

Credits

The String Cheese Incident
Bill Nershi – Acoustic guitar, vocals
Keith Moseley – Bass guitar, Harmonica, Electric guitar, vocals
Kyle Hollingsworth - Accordion, keyboards, vocals
Michael Kang– Mandolin, Violin, Viola, Guitar, vocals
Michael Travis – Acoustic guitar, Bass, drums, vocals
Jason Hann - percussion

Additional Personnel
Jim Watts - Background vocals, E-bow
Malcolm Burn - Vocals

Production
Malcolm Burn - Producer, Instrumentation
Kevin Morris - Management
Dominick Maita - Mastering
Jim Watts - Engineer
Jeremy D'Antonio - Assistant Engineer
Jamie Janover - Cover Photo
Jeremy Stein - Management
Mike Luba - Management
Jesse Aratow - Management
Nadia Prescher - Management
Breck Alan - Vocal Coach

The String Cheese Incident albums
2005 albums